A Time for Dancing is a 2002 American drama film directed by Peter Gilbert and starring Larisa Oleynik, Shiri Appleby and Peter Coyote. It is an adaptation based on the novel of the same name by Davida Wills Hurwin. The film had its United States premiere on Showtime in 2004.

Plot
Sam Russell (Shiri Appleby) tells the story of her best friend Jules Michaels (Larisa Oleynik). They met at the age of 6 in a dance class. Over the years they become best friends. Sam dances, but Jules is a true dancer, with true passion towards it and views it as important as life itself. Unfortunately, her passion becomes impossible when it turns out she has cancer.

Even after the bad news has been confirmed, Jules has a hard time dealing with it and still insists upon going for dance. To decrease the rate at which the cancer is spreading, she starts going for chemotherapy, which leaves her very exhausted after each time. It also causes her hair to fall out. Jules gradually has no choice but to start accepting the fact that she has to stop dancing because her body is always too lethargic.

However, Jules stops the chemo to dance once more and auditions for Juilliard in NYC as it has always been a dream of hers to get in. It takes a lot out of her but it pays off and she gets accepted.

Not long after, though, Jules loses the fight to cancer and dies.

Sam opens the letter from Juilliard and replies:
"Jules Michaels won't be attending Juilliard 'cause she died".

Cast
Larisa Oleynik    as Jules
Shiri Appleby     as Sam
Peter Coyote      as Wynn
Patricia Kalember as Sandra	
Scott Vickaryous  as Eli
Shane West        as Paul
Lynn Whitfield    as Linda
Amy Madigan       as Jackie
Anton Yelchin     as Jackson
Jennifer Hamilton     as Colleen
Barbara Eve Harris as Dr. Conner

Reception
A Time For Dancing was nominated for a Daytime Emmy Award and a DGA award.

References

External links
 

2002 films
2000s teen drama films
American dance films
Films based on American novels
American teen drama films
Films scored by Laurence Rosenthal
2002 drama films
2000s English-language films
2000s American films